Brackenridgea is a plant genus of about 10 species in the family Ochnaceae. The genus is named for the British-American botanist William Dunlop Brackenridge.

Description
Brackenridgea species grow as small to medium-sized trees. The flowers are white or yellow. The fruits are drupes (pitted) and are greenish, ripening black.

Distribution and habitat
Brackenridgea species grow naturally in tropical east Africa, Madagascar and Malesia.

Species
 The Plant List recognises about 13 accepted taxa (of species and infraspecific names):
 Brackenridgea alboserrata  
 Brackenridgea arenaria  
 Brackenridgea elegantissima  
 Brackenridgea fascicularis  
 subsp. mindanaensis  
 Brackenridgea forbesii 
 Brackenridgea hookeri  
 Brackenridgea madecassa  
 Brackenridgea nitida  
 subsp. australiana  
 Brackenridgea palustris  
 subsp. foxworthyi  
 Brackenridgea tetramera  
 Brackenridgea zanguebarica

References

Ochnaceae
Malpighiales genera
Taxonomy articles created by Polbot